Andesia is a genus of moths of the family Noctuidae. The genus was erected by George Hampson in 1906.

Species
Andesia apicalis (Köhler, 1979) Chile, Argentina
Andesia barilochensis Angulo & de Bros, 1996 Chile
Andesia differens (Köhler, 1951) Chile, Argentina
Andesia lesa (Köhler, 1979) Chile
Andesia oenistis Hampson, 1906 Argentina (Mendoza)
Andesia pseudoleucanides Olivares, Angulo & Moreno, 2009 Chile

References

Cuculliinae
Noctuoidea genera